Miroslav Štěpánek may refer to:

 Miroslav Štěpánek (footballer) (born 1990), Czech footballer
 Miroslav Štěpánek (artist) (1930–2005), Czech artist